Máximo Augusto Carrizo Ballesteros (born February 28, 2008) is an American soccer player who plays as a midfielder for New York City FC II.

Career

In 2022, Carrizo signed for American top flight side New York City FC, becoming the youngest player to sign a professional contract in American top flight history.

International career
Born in the United States, he has been called-up by Argentina at youth level. He has yet to appear for either nation internationally.

References

External links
 

2008 births
American people of Argentine descent
American soccer players
Argentine footballers
Association football midfielders
Living people
MLS Next Pro players
New York City FC II players
New York City FC players
Homegrown Players (MLS)